Quick Change is a 1990 American crime comedy film directed by Bill Murray and Howard Franklin (in their directorial debuts) and written by Franklin. Based on the novel of the same name by Jay Cronley, the film stars Murray, Geena Davis, Randy Quaid, and Jason Robards. Quick Change follows three people on an elaborate bank robbery and their subsequent escape.

Filmed and set in New York City, Quick Change is the second adaptation of Cronley's novel, after the 1985 Canadian film Hold-Up. It is also the only directorial credit in Murray's career.

Quick Change was theatrically released in the United States on July 13, 1990. Upon release, it was a box office bomb, grossing $15.3 million worldwide against a budget of $17 million, but received positive reviews, with praise for Murray's performance and humor.

Plot
Grimm, dressed as a clown, robs a bank in midtown Manhattan. He sets up an ingenious hostage situation strapping fake dynamite all over his waist and successfully gets away with $1 million and his accomplices: girlfriend Phyllis and best friend Loomis.

The heist itself is comparatively straightforward and easy, but the getaway turns into a nightmare. The relatively simple act of getting to the airport to catch a flight out of the country is complicated by the fact that fate, luck, and all of New York City appear to be conspiring against their escape.

To begin with, the trio is seeking the Brooklyn-Queens Expressway to get to the airport, but the signs were removed during construction work, resulting in the three robbers becoming lost in an unfamiliar neighborhood in Brooklyn. Then, a conman/thief robs the trio of everything they have (except the bank money, which they have taped under their clothes).

After changing into new clothes at Phyllis's apartment, they are confronted and nearly gunned down by the paranoid and stressed-out incoming tenant. At the same time, a fire has broken out across the street and the fire department arrives and pushes their car away from a hydrant only to cause it to roll downhill and then down an embankment.

When the three crooks eventually manage to flag down a cab, the foreign driver is hopelessly non fluent in English. This causes a hysterical Loomis to jump out of the moving cab to grab another, but he runs into a newsstand, knocking himself unconscious. The driver leaves, thinking he has killed Loomis. An anal-retentive bus driver, a run-in with mobsters, and Phyllis's increasing desperation to tell Grimm the news that she is pregnant with his child add further complications.

All the while, Rotzinger, a world-weary but relentless chief of the New York City Police Department, is doggedly attempting to nab the fleeing trio. A meeting on board an airliner at the airport occurs between the robbers and the chief, who gets the added prize of having a major crime boss dropped in his lap with their assistance. Unfortunately the chief only realizes who they were after their plane has taken off.

Cast
 Bill Murray as Grimm
 Geena Davis as Phyllis Potter
 Randy Quaid as Loomis
 Jason Robards as Chief Walt Rotzinger
 Philip Bosco as Bus Driver
 Bob Elliott as Bank Guard
 Phil Hartman as Mr. Edison
 Tony Shalhoub as Cab Driver
 Victor Argo as Mike Skelton
 Stanley Tucci as Johnny
 Kathryn Grody as Mrs. Edison
 Richard Joseph Paul as Lieutenant Dennis Jameson
 Jamey Sheridan as The Mugger
 Kurtwood Smith as Vince Lombino / Russ Crane
 Paul Herman as Interrogating Policeman

Reception

On Rotten Tomatoes the film has an approval rating of 84% based on 37 reviews, with an average rating of 6.7/10. The website's critics consensus reads: "Quick Change makes the most of its clever premise with a smartly skewed heist comedy that leaves plenty of room for its talented cast to shine." On Metacritic it has a weighted average score of 56 out of 100 based on 17 critics, indicating "mixed or average reviews". Audiences surveyed by CinemaScore gave the film an average grade of "B" on an A+ to F scale.

Several critics claim it is one of Murray's finest roles: a jaded man who has had too much of the Big Apple. Also praised were the strong performances by the supporting cast, particularly Robards as the police chief Rotzinger, who, while almost as burned out as Murray, is still determined to capture the robbers as a swan song to his long career.

Roger Ebert, in his July 13, 1990 Chicago Sun-Times review, wrote: Quick Change is a funny but not an inspired comedy. It has two directors... and I wonder if that has anything to do with its inability to be more than just efficiently entertaining."

Controversy
In her 2022 memoir Dying of Politeness, Davis claimed that Murray sexually harassed her during their first meeting for the film by insisting on using an electric massage device on her despite her repeatedly telling him to stop. She said that he was also verbally abusive to her on the set during filming, including screaming at her for being late.

References

External links
 
 Erasing Clouds retrospective article on the film

1990 films
1990 comedy films
1990 directorial debut films
1990s American films
1990s crime comedy films
1990s English-language films
1990s heist films
American crime comedy films
American heist films
Comedy films about clowns
Films about bank robbery
Films based on American novels
Films directed by Bill Murray
Films directed by Howard Franklin
Films produced by Robert Greenhut
Films scored by Randy Edelman
Films set in New York City
Films shot in New York City
Films with screenplays by Howard Franklin
Warner Bros. films
English-language crime comedy films
Films based on novels by Jay Cronley